Aghanashini may refer to:

Aghanashini (village), in Karnataka, India
Aghanashini River, also in Karnataka